Chamaesphecia elampiformis is a moth of the family Sesiidae. It is found in Turkey and Transcaucasia.

The larvae probably feed on the roots of Stachys inflata.

Subspecies
Chamaesphecia elampiformis elampiformis (Turkey and Transcaucasia)
Chamaesphecia elampiformis mandana (Le Cerf, 1938)

References

Moths described in 1851
Sesiidae
Insects of Turkey